Hopeless may refer to:
 Literally, lack of hope
Depression (mood), a state of low mood and feeling hopeless

Hopeless may also refer to:

Arts, entertainment, and media

Music 
"Hopeless", a song by The Union Trade
"Hopeless" (Andy Williams song)
"Hopeless", a song by Breaking Benjamin from the album Dear Agony
"Hopeless", a song by Dionne Farris from the soundtrack to Love Jones
"Hopeless", a song by Tay Kewei
"Hopeless", a song by Stabbing Westward from the Japanese edition of the album Darkest Days
"Hopeless", a song by Ringo Starr from the album Old Wave
"Hopeless", an unreleased song by The Offspring
"Hopeless", a song by Halsey from the album Hopeless Fountain Kingdom

Television  
"Hopeless" (How I Met Your Mother), a 2011 season 6 episode of How I Met Your Mother
"Hopeless" (True Blood), an episode of True Blood
"Hopeless", an episode of Dawson's Creek

Other uses in arts, entertainment, and media
Hopeless (Roy Lichtenstein), a 1963 oil and acrylic painting
Hopeless a book by Colleen Hoover
Hopeless Records, a record label

See also
Hope (disambiguation)
Hope
"Hopelessly", a 1993 pop song by Rick Astley
Mount Hopeless (disambiguation), various mountains in Australia and one in New Zealand
No Hope (disambiguation)